Shorea retusa is a tree in the family Dipterocarpaceae, native to Borneo. The specific epithet retusa means "notched", referring to the apex of the leaf.

Description
The brown to greyish bark is fissured. The inflorescences bear yellow flowers.

Distribution and habitat
Shorea retusa is endemic to Borneo. Its habitat is kerangas forests.

Conservation
Shorea retusa has been assessed as vulnerable on the IUCN Red List. It is threatened by conversion of land for palm oil and other tree plantations. It is also threatened by logging for its timber and human settlement. Shorea retusa does occur in a number of protected areas.

References

retusa
Endemic flora of Borneo
Plants described in 1963